Joy for Christmas Day is a studio album by American country artist, Kathy Mattea. It was released on September 30, 2003 via Narada Productions and contained 11 tracks. It was the thirteenth studio album in Mattea's career and her second album containing Christmas music. The album mixed both covers of Christmas tunes along with new material that featured writing credits from various songwriters. The disc made the American country albums chart and was received positively by critics following its release.

Background
Kathy Mattea was considered among country music's most commercially-successful and respected artists during the eighties and nineties. She had a series of top ten singles, along with four that topped the country charts in North America. She had most of her commercial success while recording for the Nashville label, Mercury/PolyGram. In 2002, she left her contract so she should explore other genres outside of country. That year, she signed with Narada Productions and released the studio album, Roses. It would be followed by Mattea's second studio album of Christmas material titled Joy for Christmas Day. Her first was 1993 studio album, Good News. Mattea had more songs she compiled and wanted to re-arrange, which resulted in the creation of her second Christmas collection. "I really wanted to see what I could do creatively with it, and those were the songs I was drawn to," she told Country Music Television.

Recording and content
Joy for Christmas Day was recorded between 2001 and 2003. The production was held at five different studios: Bingham Bend Studios, EDS, High Horse Studios, Minnesota Man Studios and PlayGround studios. The project was co-produced by Mattea, along with Ed Cash. Mattea also did several of the arrangements on the album. The project contained a total of 11 tracks. Four of the album's tracks were covers of Christmas songs: "Angels We Have Heard on High", "Hark! The Herald Angels Sing", "O Come All Ye Faithful" and "Christmas Collage". Other songs were newer Holiday material, such as "Baby King", written by singer-songwriter Marc Cohn. "And There's Still My Joy", was co-written by singer and songwriter Melissa Manchester. "All Because of Him" was co-written by Mattea, along with Ed Cash, Bill Cooley and Suzy Willis.

Release, chart performance and critical reception

Joy for Christmas Day was released on September 30, 2003 by Narada Productions. It was Mattea's thirteenth studio album in her career and her second with Narada. It was originally issued as a compact disc. It would later be released digitally. The disc did not appear on the American Billboard until December 27, 2003. It spent one week there, reaching the number 69 position. Mattea celebrated the album's release by conducting a Christmas tour, which ran from October 2 through December 14, 2003. 

Joy for Christmas Day received a positive response from critics. Jonathan Widran gave it four out of five stars in his review, praising the album's unique mixing of arrangements and styles. "The key to a strong holiday CD is finding clever new arrangements of the classics and offering originals that present the spirit in a unique way. Mattea does both," he commented. In discussing Mattea's holiday tour, the Star Tribune described the album as "excellent", highlighting the tracks "Baby King" and the song, "And There's My Joy". Brian Wahlert of Country Standard Time concluded, "Although Mattea's years in the country radio limelight have long passed, music fans should rejoice that she is still blessing us with her music."<ref>{{cite web |last1=Wahlert |first1=Brian |title=Kathy Mattea -- Joy for Christmas Day' |url=https://www.countrystandardtime.com/d/cdreview.asp?xid=1615 |website=Country Standard Time |access-date=27 November 2022}}</ref>

Track listing

Personnel
All credits are adapted from the liner notes of Joy for Christmas Day'' and AllMusic.

Musical personnel
 Jim Brock – drums, percussion
 Chris Carmichael – cello, violin, background vocals
 Ed Cash – acoustic guitar, electric guitar, mandolin, background vocals
 Mick Conley – acoustic guitar, octave bass
 Bill Cooley – acoustic guitar, national steel guitar
 Nick DiStefano – background vocals
 Gerry Gillespie – bass guitar, background vocals
 Bob Halligan – background vocals
 Byron House – upright bass
 Joanie Madden – whistle
 Kathy Mattea – lead vocals, background vocals, whistle
 Dan Needham – drums
 Matt Pierson – bass guitar
 Ben Shive – keyboards
 Carson Whitsett – keyboards, Hammond organ, piano, Wurlitzer
 Terry Wilson – background vocals

Technical personnel
 Ed Cash – mixing, producer
 Bill Cooley – arrangement
 Mick Conley – recording/mixing engineer
 Connie Gage – art direction/design
 Russ Harrington – photography
 Jamie Kimmelman – wardrobe
 Kathy Mattea – arrangement, producer
 John Mayfield – mastering
 Melanie Shelley – hair, make-up

Chart performance

Release history

References

2003 Christmas albums
Albums produced by Kathy Mattea
Christmas albums by American artists
Country Christmas albums
Kathy Mattea albums
Narada Productions albums